is a passenger railway station located in the city of Ono, Hyōgo Prefecture, Japan, operated by the private Kobe Electric Railway (Shintetsu).

Lines

Station layout
The station consists of a ground-level side platform serving a single bi-directional track. The station is unattended.

Adjacent stations

History
It was renamed April 1, 1988.

Passenger statistics
In fiscal 2019, the station was used by an average of 100 passengers daily.

See also
List of railway stations in Japan

References

External links

 Official website (Kobe Electric Railway) 

Railway stations in Japan opened in 1951
Railway stations in Hyōgo Prefecture
Ono, Hyōgo